Capys usambarae is a butterfly in the family Lycaenidae. It is found in Tanzania. The habitat consists of steep, rocky hillsides.

The larvae feed on Protea species.

References

Endemic fauna of Tanzania
Butterflies described in 1998
Capys (butterfly)